Vincent White may refer to:
 Vincent White (politician) (1885–1958), Irish politician
 Vincent White (footballer) (1897–1972), English footballer
 Vincent White (American football) (born 1961), American football player